"Fore!", originally a Scots interjection, is used to warn anyone standing or moving in the flight of a golf ball. The etymology of the word in this usage is uncertain. Mention of the term in an 1881 British Golf Museum indicates that the term was in use at least as early as that period.

A possible origin of the word is the term "fore-caddie", a caddie waiting down range from the golfer to find where the ball lands. These caddies were often warned about oncoming golf balls by a shout of the term "fore-caddie" which was eventually shortened to just "fore!". The Colonel Bogey March is based on the descending minor third which the original Colonel Bogey whistled instead of yelling "fore" around 1914.

It also may have been a contraction of the Gaelic cry Faugh A Ballagh! (i.e. Clear the way!) which is still associated with the sport of road bowling which has features reminiscent of golf.

Notes

References
 Scott, James Sibbald David, The British Army: Its Origin, Progress, and Equipment, 1868
 Windsor Magazine: An Illustrated Monthly for Men and Women Vol. 32, no. 292 (December 1910)

Golf terminology
Scottish English

sv:Lista över golftermer#Fore